The River Philip is a river contained entirely within Cumberland County, Nova Scotia, Canada.

It passes by the communities of River Philip and Oxford Junction before being crossed by Nova Scotia Highway 104. It proceeds through the town of Oxford and reaches the coast near Port Howe and Port Philip where it is crossed by Nova Scotia Trunk 6.

See also
List of rivers of Nova Scotia

References

Rivers of Nova Scotia
Landforms of Cumberland County, Nova Scotia